Terania Shire was a local government area in the Northern Rivers region of New South Wales, Australia.

Terania Shire was proclaimed on 7 March 1906, one of 134 shires created after the passing of the Local Government (Shires) Act 1905. Walter Massy-Greene was elected as the inaugural shire president.

The shire offices were in Lismore. Other towns and villages in the shire included Nimbin. 

Terania Shire was abolished and split on 1 January 1977 with part of its area absorbed by Kyogle Shire and the balance merged along with Gundurimba Shire into the City of Lismore.

References

Former local government areas of New South Wales
1906 establishments in Australia
1977 disestablishments in Australia